The Pho1 phosphate permease family (TC# 2.A.94) is a family of phosphate transporters belonging to the ion transporter (IT) superfamily. Representative members of the Pho1 family include the putative phosphate transporter PHO1 of Arabidopsis thaliana (TC# 2.A.94.1.1), and the xenotropic and polytropic murine-leukemia virus receptor Xpr1 of Culex pipiens (TC# 2.A.94.1.2).

Pho1 
Pho1 of A. thaliana is a member of the PHO1 family (11 paralogues in A. thaliana). This protein is 782 amino acyl residues in length and possesses 7 transmembrane segments (TMSs). It functions in inorganic phosphate transport and homeostasis. Pho1 catalyzes efflux of phosphate from epidermal and cortical cells into the xylem. The SPX superfamily domain is an N-terminal soluble domain. These proteins belong to the EXS (Erd1/Xpr1/Syg1) superfamily.

The generalized reaction catalyzed by Pho1 is:Pi (cells) → Pi (xylem)

See also 
 Phosphate permease
 Ion transporter superfamily
 Inorganic phosphate
 Transporter Classification Database

Further reading 
 EMBL-EBI, InterPro. "Phosphate permease (IPR004738) < InterPro < EMBL-EBI". www.ebi.ac.uk. Retrieved 2016-03-03.
 "pho-4 - Phosphate-repressible phosphate permease pho-4 - Neurospora crassa (strain ATCC 24698 / 74-OR23-1A / CBS 708.71 / DSM 1257 / FGSC 987) - pho-4 gene & protein". www.uniprot.org. Retrieved 2016-03-03.
 Versaw, W. K. (1995-02-03). "A phosphate-repressible, high-affinity phosphate permease is encoded by the pho-5+ gene of Neurospora crassa". Gene 153 (1): 135–139. ISSN 0378-1119. PMID 7883177.
 Ramaiah, Madhuvanthi; Jain, Ajay; Baldwin, James C.; Karthikeyan, Athikkattuvalasu S.; Raghothama, Kashchandra G. (2011-09-01). "Characterization of the phosphate starvation-induced glycerol-3-phosphate permease gene family in Arabidopsis". Plant Physiology157 (1): 279–291. doi:10.1104/pp.111.178541. ISSN 1532-2548. PMC 3165876. PMID 21788361.
 Stakheev, A. A.; Khairulina, D. R.; Ryazantsev, D. Yu; Zavriev, S. K. (2013-03-22). "Phosphate permease gene as a marker for the species-specific identification of the toxigenic fungus Fusarium cerealis". Russian Journal of Bioorganic Chemistry 39 (2): 153–160.doi:10.1134/S1068162013020131. ISSN 1068-1620.

References 

Protein families
Solute carrier family